The Florida Atlantic Owls men's basketball team represents Florida Atlantic University and competes in Conference USA of NCAA Division I college basketball. Their home games are played on the Abessinio Court in the FAU Arena on the school's Boca Raton, Florida campus. Their head coach is Dusty May, who was hired on March 22, 2018. The Owls have appeared in the NCAA tournament twice, in 2002 while a member of the Atlantic Sun Conference and 2023. The Owls joined Conference USA in 2013 as part of the NCAA conference realignment.

Overview and history
Florida Atlantic University basketball began play in the 1988–89 season. The Owls competed as an NCAA Division II independent until the 1993–94 season, when they moved up to Division I and the Atlantic Sun Conference. After spending 11 seasons in the Atlantic Sun, the Owls moved to the Sun Belt Conference, with the rest of Florida Atlantic University's intercollegiate sports teams. The Owls moved to Conference USA July, 2013.

Beginning: FAU gets basketball (1988–1993)
Florida Atlantic University played its first-ever intercollegiate basketball contest on November 18, 1988, against fellow local NCAA Division II school, Palm Beach Atlantic University.  The Owls won the game 111–62.  Even though the newly formed college squad hung 111 points in their first game, they would finish the inaugural season 9–19, which included a 12-game losing streak in the middle of the year.  Head coach, Lonnie Williams, was known to be a "program-builder", but after one year, left FAU after its first season to become head coach at the University of California-Davis. Williams would only last one year at UC Davis, posting an 11–16 record.

Replacing Williams was Penn State assistant coach, Tim Loomis.  Loomis started his coaching career with a 21–7 record, and followed that up with back-to-back 15–13 seasons.  The three consecutive winning seasons is a feat that no other Owls coach has ever matched.  Along with the winning seasons, Loomis was able to schedule games against neighbor and powerhouse, University of Miami Hurricanes.  Though Miami would beat the Owls soundly in the appearances, the ability to schedule games against them was seen as the Owls basketball program's growth.  Loomis would lose the core of that inaugural team after the Owls' fourth season, and the Owls would suffer devastating 3–24 (1992–93) and 3–25 (1993–94) seasons the latter being their first official year as Division One.  The members of these teams were true pioneers and super fundraisers for the athletic department as they hit the road to play teams like Florida State, Georgetown, and Iowa State while taking large paydays and suffering losses to higher ranked (#10 Georgetown) opponents.  In fact, Loomis' team beat NC State on the road in 1993–94 to become the first Atlantic Sun team to ever beat an ACC team at the time.

Move to Division I (1993–2005)
The 1993–94 season would mark the beginning of the Owls competition in the NCAA Division I.  The Owls joined the Atlantic Sun Conference later, mostly due to the fact that the Owls baseball team was exceeding expectations so early in its development.  In 1994–95, the team improved to 9–19 while in Loomis' last year.  The team repeated that win total in 1995–96 under new coach Kevin Billerman but showed improvement by taking South Florida, Saint Louis, and Southern Illinois to end of the game last possession close road losses while winning two conference games to end the season.  Former Duke Blue Devil captain and leader, Kevin Billerman, was hired to further lead the Owls into Division I; his second season produced the most wins of any Division One FAU men's basketball coach up to that point.  Due to NCAA's rule, the Owls were not eligible to be full members of the Atlantic Sun for four years, and officially began competition on the Division I level in the 1993–94 season.  In Billerman's four seasons, the Owls had two 20+ loss seasons (his last two) and only one winning season (his second).

For the 1999–00 season, FAU hired decorated UNLV All-American forward/center and NBA first-round draft pick, Sidney Green.  In his first season, Green's Owls went 2–28, with a 25-game losing streak in the middle of the season.  In each of his first and second seasons, the Owls would win their opening round game in the Atlantic Sun Conference Tournament, but would lose in the second round.

2001–02 season: A-Sun champions
During the 2001–02 season, Green would lead the Owls to his only winning season, as FAU finished 19–12 and 13–7 in the Atlantic Sun.  In the first-round of the 2002 Atlantic Sun Conference Tournament, FAU would again win their opening game, this time defeating Jacksonville University.  The Owls would break their second-round losing tradition, beating Jacksonville State University.  In the Atlantic Sun Conference Championship, the Owls faced Georgia State University and won 76–75, clinching their first and only conference championship and a bid to the NCAA Division I men's basketball tournament.

In the 2002 NCAA tournament, the Owls were seeded as a 15-seed, and placed in the South Region, and were paired with 2-seed University of Alabama.  Though the Owls hung tight throughout the game, heavily favored Alabama held on to win 86–78.

Coaching carousel (2005–present)
Green was fired after the 2004–05 season and the Owls landed former NCAA Coach of the Year and Tar Heel Matt Doherty.  Doherty led the Owls to a 15–13 record and then left abruptly to become the head coach at Southern Methodist University.

With the rapid success of the football program, created from scratch just in 2001, the Florida Atlantic sports programs again moved up in level of competition.  This time, the Owls would move to the Sun Belt Conference, and basketball played its first season of competition in the Sun Belt in the 2006–07 season.  To replace Doherty, assistant coach and former Kansas Jayhawk star, Rex Walters, was elevated.  In his first season, Walters' Owls were 16–15 and 10–8 in the Sun Belt.  The 16–15 marked the first time FAU posted back-to-back winning seasons since the 1989–90 and 1990–91 seasons.  The 10–8 conference record was only the fourth time the Owls had a winning record in conference play.  Walters' sophomore season regressed a bit, as FAU finished 15–18. After the 2007–08 season completed, Rex Walters accepted the head coaching job at the University of San Francisco, and for the third time in four years, the Owls were searching for a new coach.

FAU hired Mike Jarvis as their new coach. Jarvis had been the head coach at Boston University, George Washington University and, most recently, St. John's University. Between the three schools, Jarvis led his teams to nine total NCAA tournament appearances, including an Elite Eight appearance with St. John's in 1999.  Jarvis was fired from St. John's on December 19, 2003—the first Big East coach to be fired during the season. It later emerged that school officials had fired Jarvis in part due to a series of embarrassing off-court incidents. Among these, a junior college transfer had been charged with assaulting a female student, and a senior guard had been kicked off the team after being caught smoking marijuana near St. John's campus in Queens. During the 2003–04 season, St. John's center Abe Keita claimed that a member of Jarvis's basketball staff had paid him nearly $300 a month for the past four seasons. As a result, St. John's placed itself on two years' probation, withdrew from postseason consideration for the 2004–05 season, and forfeited 43 wins including the 2002 NCAA Tournament and the 2003 NIT. Jarvis was faulted for not properly monitoring Keita's situation. After his ouster, Jarvis was criticized for ignoring New York City's rich pool of high school players, which particularly rankled fans used to seeing national powerhouses built primarily on New York City talent. At FAU, he looked to become the first coach in NCAA basketball history to win 100 games at four different schools. Following the 2014 season, Jarvis resigned after reports indicated that he was going to be fired. He finished with a 76–112 after six years in Boca Raton.

On April 7, 2014, the school hired Michael Curry, a former NBA player and coach of the Detroit Pistons. Curry's teams never finished with more than 12 wins overall or more than six wins in conference. They never finished hired than 11th in C-USA. Following the hiring of a new athletic director, Brian White, Curry was fired after four seasons at the school and a 39–84 record.

White, brother to Florida head coach Mike White, thanked Curry for his years at FAU, but saw no reason the Owls could not compete in C-USA. On March 22, 2018, the school hired Florida assistant coach Dusty May as head coach.

Head coaches

Current coaching staff

Year-by-Year Results

Postseason

NCAA tournament results
The Owls have appeared in the NCAA tournament two times. Their record is 2–1.

NIT results
The Owls have appeared in the National Invitation Tournament (NIT) one time. Their record is 0–1.

CBI results
The Owls have appeared in the College Basketball Invitational one time. Their combined record is 0–1.

CollegeInsider.com Postseason Tournament (CIT) results

The Owls have appeared in one CollegeInsider.com Postseason Tournament (CIT). Their record is 0–1.

References

External links
 

 
1988 establishments in Florida
Basketball teams established in 1988